Antonio Longo may refer to:

 Antonio Longo (painter) (1740-1820) - also priest, born in Varena, Italy 
 Antonio Longo, former member of the music group Taking Back Sunday